Lucia Hwong is an American composer and instrumentalist. She has created music for theater, film, television, dance and the concert stage.

Biography
Hwong was born in Hawaii and raised in Los Angeles, California. Her grandmother was a grande dame of Chinese opera and her mother is international actress Lisa Lu. Her first public performance was in concert, playing the pipa, an ancient Chinese lute, at the age of six. She studied ethnomusicology, theater and dance at UCLA and Columbia University from 1978 to 1982, graduating with a B.A. degree cum laude in ethnomusicology.

She has chaired philanthropic events for organizations including the Women's Project, American Theatre Wing, Asia Society and Parrish Art Museum and has been on committees such as Southampton Hospital.

She was married to investment banker Peter Gordon (1942-2020), with whom she had two daughters.

Compositions

Her music for theater includes the scores for the Tony Award-winning Broadway production of M. Butterfly and Tony-nominated Golden Child; as well as David Henry Hwang's New York Shakespeare Festival presentations of Sound and Beauty and The Dance and the Railroad and the Obie Award-winner FOB. She composed the music for Iago and Venus Voodoo at Lincoln Center.

Hwong also scored the Mark Taper and McCarter Theatre premieres of Anna Deavere Smith's Twilight: Los Angeles 1992  and created a 12-tone fugue for Joyce Carol Oates' The Perfectionist. Among her dance scores, Fierce Attachments debuted at the Brooklyn Academy of Music's Next Wave Festival. She also scored Ali MacGraw's Yoga Mindbody and created music for the Guggenheim Museum's Soho video wall.

Her music for television and film include Hiroshima (NBC), Vietnam War Story (HBO), Forbidden Nights (Tiananmen Square massacre) (ABC), Paper Angels (Angel Island) (PBS), Jennifer's in Jail (girl gangs) (Lifetime), Lotus (women's emancipation in China) (AFI), Who Killed Vincent Chin? (racial murder) (1998 Oscar nomination: Best Documentary) and Silverlake Life: the View from Here (AIDS), honored with Sundance Film Festival and Peabody awards.

Concert pieces include The Unwelcome and Rhythm of Your Pulse, commissioned and performed by the Women's Philharmonic.

Her two albums, House of Sleeping Beauties and Secret Luminescence were released on the Private Music label. The Goddess Trilogy CDs of new-age music were released on her own label, Goddess Music, and received a Visionary Award in 2000.

Discography 
The works of Lucia Hwong

Recognition

In 1978, Hwong received a Citation of Outstanding Contribution by the Board of Public Works of the City of Los Angeles. Time magazine (September 1986) and The New York Times (May 1986) included her in a list of America's exceptional new composers; and in 1993, she received the first Asian American Arts award from the Asian American Arts Alliance as Artist of the Year.

Composer Philip Glass wrote, "a young generation of composers has begun to appear. And the thing which distinguishes them...is that they represent...dual tradition...perhaps really for the first time, or something new. Not a borrowing from one tradition or incorporating the sounds of another, but a real blending of Eastern and Western music. Lucia Hwong is such a composer."

Hwong is on the Board of The Women's Project and was honored at its Women of Achievement Awards on March 2, 2009. Mayor Bloomberg declared the day "Women's Project Day" by Proclamation. Lucia has chaired the 21st, 22nd and 23rd Women's Project Galas.

References

External links
 

American women composers
21st-century American composers
Year of birth missing (living people)
Living people
American people of Chinese descent
Private Music artists
UCLA School of the Arts and Architecture alumni
Columbia University School of the Arts alumni
Musicians from Hawaii
Musicians from Los Angeles
Place of birth missing (living people)
21st-century American women musicians
21st-century women composers